Stettler is a town in east-central Alberta, Canada that is surrounded by the County of Stettler No. 6. The town is nicknamed "The Heart of Alberta".

History 
Stettler was founded in 1905 and was named after Swiss immigrant Carl Stettler, who also founded a settlement east of the town at Blumenau, as well as being influential in the nearby community of Castor. He also served on the first Town Council of Stettler.

Geography

Climate 
Stettler experiences a humid continental climate (Köppen climate classification Dfb).

Demographics 

In the 2016 Census of Population conducted by Statistics Canada, the Town of Stettler recorded a population of 5,952 living in 2,415 of its 2,607 total private dwellings, a  change from its 2011 population of 5,748.

The population of the Town of Stettler according to its 2008 municipal census is 5,843.

The median household income in 2005 for Stettler was $56,201, which is below the Alberta provincial average of $63,988.

Attractions 

In addition, Stettler has a historic Parrish & Heimbecker grain elevator overlooking the railway tracks. One of the last elevators in Alberta and the only survivor of the three elevators that previously operated in Stettler. It operates as a museum and also houses a 1887 Heeber and Son's Little Giant threshing machine, a 1912 International Harvester hit-and-miss engine called the Beast and a 1940s Ford tractor called Mickey Mouse. All run (including the elevator's "leg") and in 2016 the Little Giant travelled to Winnipeg and joined more than 150 other threshing machines that claimed a Guinness World Records record for the most threshing machines operating simultaneously. The Little Giant had the distinction of being the oldest one there and possibly may be one of the oldest still working threshing machines.

There is also a county museum featuring the original town train station which was moved and other historic buildings.

The Jewel Theatre was built in 1952. The movie theatre was renovated in 2021 to become a 200-seat theatre.

Government 
As of 2022, the mayor is Sean Nolls, and the councillors are Cheryl Barros, Kurt Baker, Travis Randell, Gord Lawlor, Scott Pfeiffer, and Wayne Smith.

Education 
The town has two schools in the Clearview Public Schools school district: Stettler Elementary School, and William E. Hay Stettler Secondary Campus.

Christ King Catholic School is part of the East Central Catholic School Division.

Notable people 
 Kenn Borek, founder of Kenn Borek Air
 Robert Raymond Cook, "last man to be hanged in Alberta" after the 1959 murder of his family
 Bob Falkenberg, retired professional hockey player 
Marie Jean Laing, Canadian politician, NDP MLA (1986-1993)
 Brian Ogilvie, retired professional hockey player
 Chester Reynolds, Social Credit party politician in the Alberta provincial government and grandfather to Ryan Reynolds

See also 
 List of communities in Alberta
 List of towns in Alberta

References

External links 

 
1906 establishments in Alberta
Populated places established in 1905
Towns in Alberta